Dichomeris caerulescens is a moth in the family Gelechiidae. It was described by Edward Meyrick in 1913. It is found in Assam, India.

The forewings are dark fuscous, with strong bluish-leaden reflections. The stigmata is rather large, blackish, the plical somewhat before the first discal. There is an ochreous-whitish dot on costa at two-thirds. There is a terminal series of blackish dots. The hindwings are grey.

References

Moths described in 1913
caerulescens